

National Association
Chinese Curling Association
Hong Kong Curling Association

Clubs
CSO Curling Club - Huairou, Beijing
奥星冰壶俱乐部 - Harbin, Heilongjiang
KSR Curling Club 錦上路冰壶俱乐部 (In Construction/在建)

China
Sports organizations of China
Curling